Longforth Farm, on the outskirts of Wellington, Somerset, England, is the site of a Bronze Age landscape and an extensive medieval structure.

The stone foundations, which are covered in decorated tiles are laid out around courtyards. The remains of roof slates and glazed ceramic roof tiles have also been found. The floor tiles are similar to those at Glastonbury Abbey, while the pottery finds have been dated to between the 12th and 14th centuries.

References

External links
  BBC News, "Medieval site discovered near Wellington", 8 July 2013
 Somerset County Gazette, "Medieval 'manor house' unearthed at Longforth Farm development in Wellington", 8 July 2013
  Western Morning News, "Unexplained - The Riddle of the Somerset Sands mansion", 9 July 2013

Archaeological sites in Somerset
Wellington, Somerset